Daddy Gets Married or Papa się żeni is a 1936 Polish comedy film directed by Michał Waszyński.

Cast
Lidia Wysocka ...  Lili
Jerzy Sulima-Jaszczolt
Mira Zimińska ...  Mira Stella
Jadwiga Andrzejewska ...  Jadzia
Klara Belska
Stefania Betcherowa
Franciszek Brodniewicz...  Visconti
Zofia Downarówna
Antoni Fertner ...  Baron
Stefania Górska ...  Dancer
Władysław Grabowski...  Ralfini
Stanisław Grolicki ...  City Editor
Fryderyk Jarossy...  Director of the 'Olimpii'
Eugeniusz Koszutski
Edmund Minowicz
Zbigniew Rakowiecki...  Jerzy Murski
Wincenty Rapacki
Stanisław Sielański ...  Visconti's servant

External links 
 

1936 films
1930s Polish-language films
Polish black-and-white films
Films directed by Michał Waszyński
1936 romantic comedy films
Polish films based on plays
Polish romantic comedy films